Racing Athletic Club Casablanca is a Moroccan football club currently playing in the Botola 2. The club was founded in 1917 under the name of Racing Athlétic de Casablanca, but in 1969 the name was changed to Association des Douanes Marocains (ADM). In the 1980s the name was changed back to its original format.

Honours

Ligue du Maroc de Football Association: 2
1945, 1954

Moroccan League First Division: 1
1972
Second Place : 1962, 1965

Coupe du Trône: 1
1968

Moroccan League Second Division: 1
2000

References

External links

Football clubs in Morocco
Football clubs in Casablanca
1917 establishments in Morocco
Sports clubs in Morocco
Association football clubs established in 1917